Is-haq may refer to:
Is-haq, Kerman
Is-haq, Qazvin